A Married Couple may refer to:

A Married Couple (1969 film), a 1969 Canadian documentary film by Allan King
A Married Couple (1983 film), a 1983 Israeli drama film by Yitzhak Yeshurun

See also